Moforsen Hydroelectric Power Station is a run-of-the-river hydroelectric power plant on the Ångerman, municipality Sollefteå, Sweden. About 15 km downstream of Moforsen is Forsmo Hydroelectric Power Station.

The power plant was operational in 1968. It is owned by E.ON.

Dam
Moforsen Dam consists of a concrete gravity dam on the right side and an embankment dam on the left side. The dam features a spillway with 3 gates over the dam, that is located in the middle.

Power plant 
The power plant contains 3 Kaplan turbine-generators. The total nameplate capacity is 135 MW. Its average annual generation is 641 GWh. The hydraulic head is 28.1 m.

See also

 List of hydroelectric power stations in Sweden

References

External links 

Dams in Sweden
Hydroelectric power stations in Sweden
Gravity dams
Embankment dams
Dams completed in 1968
Energy infrastructure completed in 1968
1968 establishments in Sweden